Deuter (born Georg Deuter, 1945) is a German new age instrumentalist and recording artist known for his meditative style that blends Eastern and Western musical elements.

Discography
 1971 - D 
 1972 - Aum 
 1975 - Kundalini Meditation Music
 1975 - Nadabrahma Meditation Music 
 1975 - Nataraj Meditation Music 
 1975 - Mandala Meditation Music 
 1975 - Whirling Meditation Music 
 1975 - Devavani Meditation Music 
 1975 - Tea from an empty Cup 
 1976 - Riding the Bull 
 1976 - Celebration 
 1976 - Dynamic Meditation Music 
 1978 - Haleakala 
 1978 - Ecstasy 
 1978 - Sea and Silence (first edition)
 1978 - Flowers of Silence (first edition)
 1979 - Orange Tree (first edition)
 1980 - Like the Wind in the Trees (first edition)
 1981 - Silence Is the Answer 
 1982 - Cicada 
 1984 - Nirvana Road 
 1984 - Phantasiereisen 
 1984 - San 
 1986 - Bashos Pond 
 1986 - Call of the Unknown: Selected Pieces 1972-1986 
 1987 - Phantasiereisen 
 1988 - Land of Enchantment 
 1990 - Healing Hypno Trances 
 1990 - Petrified Forest 
 1991 - Sands of Time 
 1992 - Henon 
 1992 - Tao Te King Music & Words 
 1993 - Relax 
 1994 - Inside Hypno Relaxation 
 1994 - Terra magica: Planet of Light
 1995 - Klänge der Liebe Relaxation 
 1995 - Wind & Mountain 
 1995 - In Trance Hypno 
 1995 - Chakras 
 1996 - Tu dir gut 
 1997 - Nada Himalaya Tibetan Bells 
 1998 - Reiki Hands of Light
 1998 - Die Blaue Blume 
 1998 - Chakra 
 1999 - Garden of the Gods 
 2000 - Männerrituale Music & Words 
 2000 - Frauenrituale Music & Words 
 2000 - Sun Spirit
 2000 - Reiki: Music For The Harmonious Spirit
 2001 - Buddha Nature
 2001 - Wind & Mountain 
 2002 - Like the Wind in the Trees 
 2003 - Sea & Silence
 2004 - Earth Blue
 2005 - Tibet: Nada Himalaya, Vol. 2
 2005 - East of the Full Moon
 2007 - Koyasan: Reiki Sound Healing
 2008 - Spiritual Healing 
 2009 - Atmospheres
 2009 - Notes From a Planet
 2009 - Eternity
 2009 - Celebration of Light: Music for Winter and the Christmas Season
 2010 - Mystery of Light
 2011 - Empty Sky
 2012 - Flowers of Silence 
 2012 - Ocean Waves 
 2013 - Dream Time
 2015 - Mystic Voyage
 2015 - Reiki Hands of Love
 2015 - Illumination of the Heart
 2016 - Immortelle
 2017 - Space
 2017 - Bamboo Forest
 2018 - Sattva Temple Trance
 2019 - Mirage
 2021 - Song of the Last Tree

See also 
List of ambient music artists

References

External links
 https://www.cgdeuter.com
 https://www.newearthrecords.com/artists/music-by-deuter/

1945 births
Living people
German male musicians
New-age musicians